Ghantasala mandal is one of the 25 mandals in the Krishna district of the Indian state of Andhra Pradesh. The headquarters of this mandal is located in the town of Ghantasala.

Geography 
The mandal is bordered by Pamidimukkala and Movva to the north, Guduru mandal to the east, Mopidevi mandal to the south, and Krishna river to the west.

Demographics 
As at the 2011 census, the population was 40,098 people residing in 12,946 households, divided into 20,182 males and 19,916 females, for a gender ratio of 987 females per 1000 males. 3,251 children were 0–6 years, of which 1,783 were boys and 1,468 were girls for a gender ratio of 823 females per 1000 males. The average literacy rate stands at 73.85%. 14,693 residents were members of Scheduled Castes and 1,155 of Scheduled Tribes.

Economy
In 2011, the Census of India reported that 21,664 citizens were engaged in work activities including 12,566 were males and 9,105 females. 19,547 workers described their occupations, including 2,277 cultivators, 13,391 agricultural laborers, 927 in the household industry, and 2,952 with other types of work. In the last group, 2,124 were marginal workers.

Administration 
The mandal is administered under the Avanigadda Assembly constituency of the Machilipatnam Lok Sabha constituency. It is one of the 7 mandals in Vuyyuru revenue division.

Towns and villages 
 census, 22 settlements were in Ghantasala mandal. Ghantasala is the largest and Birudugadda is the smallest in population.

The settlements in the mandal are:

Education 
Ghantasala mandal plays a major role in education for rural students of nearby villages. Primary and secondary school education is imparted by government, aided by private schools under the School Education Department. For the academic year 2015–16, the mandal had more than 2,489 students enrolled in over 56 schools.

See also 
 List of mandals in Andhra Pradesh
 Vijayawada

References

Mandals in Krishna district